Route 47 is a state highway in the southern part of New Jersey. It runs  from Atlantic Avenue in Wildwood, Cape May County north to U.S. Route 130 in Brooklawn, Camden County. It is also referred to as Delsea Drive, as it connects the Delaware River near Brooklawn to the Atlantic Ocean (the sea) in Wildwood. This name was assigned by the New Jersey Legislature in 1933. The route runs through rural areas of Cape May and southern Cumberland counties as a two-lane road. Traffic jams along this portion of Route 47 are commonplace in the summer vacation season and can stretch for miles due to the missing southern section of Route 55, where all Jersey Shore-bound traffic enters the small two-lane road. North of here, the route runs through the cities of Millville and Vineland before entering Gloucester County, where it passes through more rural areas as well as Clayton and Glassboro. Past Glassboro, it heads through suburban areas in Washington and Deptford townships before running through Westville and Brooklawn. Route 47 is the longest signed state route in New Jersey.

What is now Route 47 was originally designated as part of pre-1927 Route 15 between Rio Grande in 1917 and as a branch of pre-1927 Route 20 between Millville and Westville in 1923. In 1927, Route 47 was designated to run from Tuckahoe to Brooklawn, following current Route 49 south of Millville. Meanwhile, current Route 47 was a part of Route 49 between South Dennis and Millville and Route S49 between Rio Grande and South Dennis. The latter was extended to Wildwood in 1938. Route 47 and Route 49 were shifted onto their current alignments south of Millville in 1953. Since then, Route 47 has seen a few improvements and modifications including realignment in Millville and the reconstruction of the intersection with Route 83 in Dennis Township.

Route description

Cape May County 

Route 47 begins at a traffic light with Atlantic Avenue in the Jersey Shore city of Wildwood in Cape May County, heading to the northwest on Rio Grande Avenue, a four-lane divided highway that is county maintained and signed as County Route 661. From this intersection, Rio Grande Avenue continues southeast a block to an intersection with Ocean Avenue near the Wildwood Boardwalk. The road passes through residential and commercial areas before crossing County Route 621 (Ocean Drive), where it becomes a four-lane undivided road. Upon crossing Park Boulevard, the route passes businesses and intersects Susquehanna Avenue. Here, Route 47 becomes signed and maintained by the New Jersey Department of Transportation, turning into a divided highway again a short distance later at the intersection with County Route 624 (West Rio Grande Boulevard). At this intersection, the route enters Lower Township and crosses over the Grassy Sound via the George Redding Bridge, which is a drawbridge. The road turns more to the west-northwest and runs through wetlands with some homes to the south of the road, with the Wildwoods Welcome Center adjacent to the southbound lanes; the welcome center is accessible via a direct southbound ramp and via a left turn northbound. Route 47 enters Middle Township and continues past more marshland as well as some marinas adjacent to the Richardson Sound on the south side of the road.  The route turns northwest again and comes to a partial cloverleaf interchange with the Garden State Parkway. Past this interchange, Route 47 heads into a commercial district in the Rio Grande section of Middle Township. At the intersection with Fifth Street, the route becomes a three-lane undivided road with a center left-turn lane and continues to an intersection with U.S. Route 9 (Shore Road).

Past the U.S. Route 9 intersection, Route 47 becomes Delsea Drive and continues past more businesses, crossing the Cape May Seashore Lines railroad before intersecting County Route 626. Here, the route becomes a two-lane road and heads into more residential areas with some commercial establishments. At the intersection with County Route 654, Route 47 turns north and leaves the Rio Grande area, heading into woods with some farm fields. It passes homes again and intersects County Route 603 in Green Creek. From here, the road continues past homes with some areas of forests and farms. Route 47 comes to an intersection with County Route 618 which, along with Route 147, provides an alternate route to The Wildwoods. Past this intersection, the road passes more rural dwellings and enters the community of Dias Creek, where it intersects County Route 612.  The route crosses over Bidwell Creek near wetlands and heads into forests. It reaches the residential community of Goshen, where there is an intersection with County Route 615. Past Goshen, Route 47 turns northeast and heads through rural woods and farms with some homes and wetlands.

Upon crossing Sluice Creek, the route enters Dennis Township and heads into residential areas in the community of South Dennis. Here, the road intersects County Route 657 and turns to the north. Route 47 briefly widens into a two-lane divided highway as it intersects the western terminus of Route 83. Past this intersection, the road heads through marshland and crosses over the Dennis Creek. It continues into Dennisville, where the route intersects County Route 610 before turning west near Johnson Pond and intersecting County Route 611 (Tyler Road). Route 47 passes more homes before coming to the southern terminus of County Route 557. Past the County Route 557 intersection, the road runs through woodland before coming to the southern terminus of Route 347.  Here, Route 47 turns to the west and passes a mix of residences, woods, and fields. It turns northwest and crosses East Creek before coming to an intersection with County Route 550 Spur. Past this intersection, the road intersects Old State Highway, a connector road to County Route 550 Spur, before turning west into wooded areas.

Cumberland County 

Upon crossing West Creek, Route 47 enters Maurice River Township, Cumberland County and continues west through more forests. It enters a mix of residences and woodland as it makes a turn to the north past the intersection with County Route 651. The route runs through more woods, with a clearing for Bayside State Prison to the east of the road. The road comes to an intersection with County Route 550 and County Route 710 to the east of Leesburg and continues north. Route 47 reaches an intersection with County Route 670 in a commercial area prior to Route 347 merging back into the route. Here, Route 47 splits into a brief one-way pair with the northbound direction heading east on County Route 670 and north on Route 347, and the southbound direction remaining on Delsea Drive. From here, Route 47 continues north on Delsea Drive through forested areas with some homes before crossing over the Muskee Creek. It continues into the community of Port Elizabeth, where it meets the western terminus of County Route 548. Just past this intersection, the route crosses the Manumuskin River and continues north through woodland with some development. The route intersects the southern terminus of Route 55, where that route continues north along the road and Route 47 turns off at a jughandle. South of the Route 55 intersection, Route 47 is part of a major road linking the Philadelphia area with the Jersey Shore resorts of Cape May County. During the summer months, it sees regular traffic jams from traffic coming off Route 55. A proposal to extend Route 55 south to Cape May County, on hold for decades due to environmental concerns, would relieve traffic along Route 47.

From here, Route 47 continues through a mix of trees and residences, intersecting Schooner Landing Road, which provides access to and from northbound Route 55. Just past this intersection, the route crosses the Manantico Creek into Millville, where it becomes South Second Street, and continues past more woodland containing residences. As the route continues north, residential development increases along with commercial and industrial establishments. Route 47 reaches the commercial downtown of Millville, where it crosses Route 49/County Route 555 and becomes North Second Street. County Route 555 parallels Route 47 a block to the east as the road crosses a Winchester and Western Railroad line and intersects County Route 552 Spur. Past this intersection, County Route 555 heads farther to the east and Route 47 crosses the Winchester and Western Railroad line a second time, passing a mix of residences, businesses, and industrial buildings. The road becomes three lanes with a center-left turn lane as it heads through commercial areas in the northern part of Millville. Upon intersecting High Street, the route widens to five lanes before entering Vineland, where the name becomes Delsea Drive again and it intersects Route 55 at a partial cloverleaf interchange.

Past this interchange, Route 47 passes the Cumberland Mall on the east side of the road as a six-lane divided highway. Past the mall, the route becomes a five-lane road with a center left-turn lane again and passes more commercial establishments in the southern part of Vineland, before heading into wooded residential areas with some farmland. It crosses County Route 552 and becomes a two-lane road, running through business areas with some homes. As Route 47 continues north through the city, it comes to an intersection with Chestnut Avenue, where it gains a center left-turn lane. From here, it passes more commercial buildings before crossing Landis Avenue, which heads to the west as Route 56. Past this intersection, the road crosses a Winchester and Western Railroad line before intersecting County Route 540. Route 47 continues north through a mix of dwellings and businesses in the northern part of Vineland, narrowing back into a two-lane road at the crossing of County Route 681.  The road heads through predominantly residential areas as it comes to an intersection with County Route 674. Past this intersection, the route passes near Kroelinger Airport and continues through mostly rural inhabited areas with some businesses. It crosses County Route 690 (Weymouth Road) before passing through wooded sectors with some homes and farms.

Gloucester and Camden counties 

Route 47 crosses into Franklin Township, Gloucester County, where it passes more farms, woods, and homes before coming to an intersection with U.S. Route 40 in the community of Malaga. Here, U.S. Route 40 and Route 47 form a concurrency and head northeast through populated areas as a three-lane road with a center left-turn lane, crossing over Conrail Shared Assets Operations' Vineland Secondary railroad line. Immediately after this crossing, U.S. Route 40 splits from Route 47 by heading southeast on Harding Highway while Route 47 turns northwest to continue along Delsea Drive, a two-lane road. Route 47 leaves Malaga and passes through a mix of dwellings and businesses with some areas of farms and woods, running a short distance to the east of the railroad line. The road heads into more forested areas before it comes to an intersection with County Route 612 in the residential and business community of Iona. Route 47 continues past homes and commercial establishments as it comes to a crossroads with County Route 538, where it turns to the north. The route passes more development with some farmland before it enters Clayton.

Here, the road heads through residential areas with some commercial establishments, crossing County Route 610 in the center of town. As the road continues north, it heads through a mix of homes and farmland with a few commercial areas. Route 47 enters inhabited areas again as it crosses into Glassboro. The road continues north and enters business areas before heading into neighborhoods and coming to an intersection with High Street, which runs east as U.S. Route 322/County Route 536 and west as County Route 641. Here, U.S. Route 322 and County Route 536 join Route 47 for a concurrency. The three routes head through commercial areas before U.S. Route 322 and County Route 536 turn to the west on West Street. Past this intersection, Route 47 continues north as a three-lane road with a center left-turn lane, passing more buildings. The route intersects County Route 553 and forms a concurrency with that route which lasts until County Route 553 turns north onto Woodbury Avenue. Along this concurrency, the road widens to five lanes as it passes a couple shopping centers. Past the concurrency, Route 47 runs north through suburban localities as a two-lane road, entering Washington Township at the crossing of Kressey Lake. In Washington Township, the road passes more populated areas as well as businesses. Route 47 runs to the east of Bethel Mill County Park before entering more residential areas, crossing County Route 635. The road passes through a mix of homes and commercial establishments with some farmland and wooded areas as it continues through more of Washington Township.

At the border with Deptford Township, Route 47 reaches an intersection known as Five Points. Here, the road meets Route 41, County Route 603, and County Route 630. Route 47 turns northwest as this intersection and runs through wooded areas with some dwellings, with Route 55 intersecting the route at a cloverleaf interchange a short distance later. Past this interchange, the road continues through wooded inhabited areas, eventually turning due north. It comes to an intersection with the western terminus of County Route 534 as the route heads through more suburban homes along with businesses. Past this intersection, Route 47 passes businesses before crossing over the New Jersey Turnpike without an interchange. From here, it heads through more inhabited areas before entering Westville. Upon entering Westville, the route has a partial cloverleaf interchange with Interstate 295. Past this interchange, the road runs through neighborhoods, intersecting County Route 621 (Almonesson Road) and County Route 551. The latter forms a concurrency with Route 47 and these two routes run northeast through commercial areas as a four-lane undivided road, crossing the Big Timber Creek into Brooklawn, Camden County. Here, it comes to a traffic circle with U.S. Route 130 and County Route 753, where Route 47 ends and County Route 551 continues on to Camden, forming a brief concurrency with U.S. Route 130.

History 

The portion of Route 47 south of Port Elizabeth was a part of the Cohanseu trail, a Lenape trail running from Swedesboro to Cape May. North of Port Elizabeth, the road was maintained by several turnpikes: the Westville and Glassboro Turnpike, chartered in 1852, following Tanyard Road and Woodbury Road south of New Sharon; the Glassboro and Malaga Turnpike, chartered in 1851; the Millville and Malaga Turnpike, chartered in 1852; and the Port Elizabeth and Millville Turnpike, chartered in 1852. The modern road north of Port Elizabeth and from Dennisville to Goshen was incorporated into the Cape May Way, an auto trail running from Camden to Cape May. 

The road was originally designated as a segment of pre-1927 Route 15 between Rio Grande and Millville in 1917, and as one of two branches of pre-1927 Route 20 between Millville and Westville in 1923. In the 1927 New Jersey state highway renumbering, Route 47 was legislated to run from Route 50 in Tuckahoe to Brooklawn, following present-day Route 49 between Tuckahoe and Millville and its current alignment north of Millville. Meanwhile, the present-day alignment of Route 47 between the current Route 83 intersection in South Dennis and Millville was designated a part of Route 49 while the current alignment between South Dennis and U.S. Route 9/Route 4 in Rio Grande became Route S49, a spur of Route 49. In 1933, the New Jersey Legislature named Route 47 Delsea Drive after a reporter for the Woodbury Times joked how the road connected the DELaware River to the Atlantic SEA. Route S49 was extended from Rio Grande to Park Boulevard in Wildwood in 1938. In the 1953 New Jersey state highway renumbering, Route 47 and Route 49 switched alignments south and east of Millville and Route 47 replaced Route S49 south to Wildwood.

By the 1980s, Route 47 was moved from High Street to North Second Street through the northern part of Millville. An alternate route of Route 47 was eventually created to the east along county routes in Cape May and Cumberland counties; this eventually became Route 347 by the 1990s. In the 2000s, Rio Grande Avenue in Wildwood received improvements to make it reminisce the doo wop atmosphere the beach resort is known for. The Route 47 bridge over Dennis Creek in Dennis Township and the Route 83 intersection received improvements that were completed in July 2007. The Route 47 bridge over the creek was structurally deficient and in need of replacing. The job was completed with wider shoulders and a wider sidewalk on the new bridge. The intersection between Route 47 and Route 83 was also realigned and had signals installed. 

The project was completed in 2020. A dedication ceremony marking the completion of the project was held on July 1, 2020, with local officials in attendance. As part of the project, Rio Grande Avenue leading into Wildwood was to be renamed to Beach Ball Boulevard following a contest to rename the roadway. However, on July 10, 2020, it was announced that the Wildwood city commissioners decided to keep the road name as Rio Grande Avenue after receiving input from residents that the road name should not change.

Major intersections

See also 
Glassboro–Camden Line, a planned light rail line paralleling Route 47 from Brooklawn to Glassboro

References

External links 

New Jersey Roads: Route 47

Intracoastal Waterway
047
Transportation in Camden County, New Jersey
Transportation in Cumberland County, New Jersey
Transportation in Cape May County, New Jersey
Transportation in Gloucester County, New Jersey